Jordan frame may refer to:

 Jordan and Einstein frames, arising in the theory of relativity
 Jordan frame (Jordan algebra), complete sets of pairwise orthogonal minimal idempotents in a Jordan algebra
 A specific type of spinal board used in Australia